This is a list of members of the 34th Legislative Assembly of Queensland from 19 May 1956 to 3 August 1957, as elected at the 1956 state election held on 19 May 1956.

The term was cut short by a split within the governing Labor Party—the Premier, Vince Gair, and all but one of his ministers were expelled from the Party on 24 April 1957. He and 25 members of Parliament formed the Queensland Labor Party on 26 April, whilst the remaining Labor members became the main Opposition party and elected Jack Duggan as leader. Gair continued as Premier but could not obtain supply from the Parliament, so an election was called.

 On 29 July 1956, the Labor member for Ithaca, Leonard Eastment, died. Labor candidate Pat Hanlon won the resulting by-election on 8 December 1956.
 On 13 July 1957, three weeks before the 1957 state election, George Devries, the QLP (formerly ALP) member for Gregory, died. The election was therefore postponed in Gregory, and Country candidate Wally Rae won a special by-election called for 5 October 1957.

See also
1956 Queensland state election
Gair Ministry (Labor/QLP) (1952–1957)

References

 Waterson, D.B. Biographical register of the Queensland Parliament, 1930-1980 Canberra: ANU Press (1982)
 

Members of Queensland parliaments by term
20th-century Australian politicians